Below is a list of Cuban artists (in alphabetical order by last name) includes artists of various genres, who are notable and are either born in Cuba, of Cuban descent or who produced works that are primarily about Cuba.

A
Agustín Drake Aldama (born 1934), metal sculptor, born in Matanzas
Nela Arias-Misson (1915–2015), Cuban-born American abstract, expressionist painter
Armando de Armas Romero (1914–1981), Havana painter
Belkis Ayón (1967–1999), Havana painter and lithographer

B
Eduardo Muñoz Bachs (1937–2001), Spanish-born Cuban poster artist
Henry Ballate (born 1966), artist, born in Aguada de Pasajeros
Juan Pablo Ballester Carmenates (born 1966), photographer, video artist, born in Camagüey
Dulce Beatriz (born 1931), painter, born in Havana
José Bedia Valdés (born 1959), painter, born in Havana
Mario Bencomo (born 1953), painter, born in Pinar del Río
Félix Alberto Beltrán Concepción (1938–2022), designer
Cundo Bermúdez (1914–2008), Cuban-born American painter, born Havana
José Bernal (1925–2010), Cuban-born American painter and sculptor
Joaquín Blez Marcé (1886–1974), photographer 
Carlos Alberto Cruz Boix (born 1949), painter and sculptor
Saidel Brito Lorenzo (born 1973), drawing, sculpture, installation, photography, born in Matanzas
Adriano Buergo (born 1964), painting, drawing, installations

C
Camila Cabello (born 1997), singer
F. Lennox Campello (born 1956), visual artist, art critic, art dealer, writer
Agustín Cárdenas (1927–2001), sculptor 
Carlos Rodríguez Cárdenas (born 1962), painter
Williams Carmona (born 1967), painter
Maria Emilia Castagliola (born 1946), mixed-media artist
Consuelo Castañeda (born 1958), painter 
Pedro Álvarez Castelló (1967–2004), Cuban-born American painter, lived in Tempe, Arizona
Humberto Castro (born 1957), painter 
Hugo Consuegra (1929–2003), Cuban-born painter, lived in New York City
Rafael Consuegra (born 1941), sculptor and painter 
Raúl Corrales (1925–2006), photographer
Miguel Cubiles (1937–2005), Cuban-born Mexican paintings, ceramics, and engravings, lived in Mexico City
Liliam Cuenca (born 1944), painter

D
Demi (artist) (born 1955), Cuban-born American contemporary painter, active in Miami 
Ana Albertina Delgado Álvarez (born 1963), contemporary artist
Angel Delgado Fuentes (born 1965), visual artist
Rolando López Dirube (1928–1997), Cuban-born Puerto Rican painter and sculptor
Fernando Díaz Domínguez (1932–1983), painter

E
Ofill Echevarria (born 1972) Cuban-born American painter and multimedia artist, based in New York City
Juan Francisco Elso (1956–1988) multidisciplinary artist
Carlos Enríquez (1900–1957), painter
Carlos Estevez (born 1969), visual artist

F
Emilio Falero (born 1947), Cuban American painter
Agustin Fernandez (1928–2006), Cuban-born American painter, sculptor, and multimedia artist
Jesse A. Fernández (1925–1986), Cuban-born French artist, photographer, and photojournalist
Teresita Fernández (born 1968), American artist of Cuban descent, known for public sculptures
Miguel Fleitas, (born 1956), Cuban-born American visual artist, photographer, and film director
Jose Emilio Fuentes Fonseca, (born 1974), Cuban outsider artist
Lourdes Gomez Franca (1933–c. 2018) Cuban-born American painter and poet, active in Miami

G
Humberto Jesús Castro García (born 1957), painter and printmaker 
Carlos Rafael Uribazo Garrido (born 1951), multidisciplinary artist 
Aaron Gilbert (born 1979), American painter of Cuban descent, active in Brooklyn, New York
Juan Ramón Valdés Gómez (born 1968), painter
Jose Ramon Gonzalez Delgado (born 1953), painter and ceramicist
Juan Gonzalez (1942–1993), Cuban-born American painter, active in New York City

H
Diango Hernández (born 1970), Cuban-born painter, active in Germany
Jose Acosta Hernandez (born 1966) Cuban-born American, painter and sculptor
Carlos Enrique Prado Herrera (born 1978), sculptor and ceramist, active in New York City
Mirta Cerra Herrera (1904–1986), painter
Abel Herrero (born 1971), Cuban-born Italian multidisciplinary artist

J
Miguel Jorge (1928–1984), Cuban-born American painter and sculptor, lived in Coral Gables, Florida
Josignacio (born 1963), contemporary painter, and creator of a plastic paint medium,

K
Alberto Korda (1928–2001), photographer, famous for his photograph of Che Guevara, lived in Paris

L
Tony Labat (born 1951), Cuban-born American conceptual artist working within video art, installation art, and sculpture
Roger Aguilar Labrada (born 1947), painter, graphic designer, born in Pilon
Wifredo Lam (1902–1982), Cuban-born painter, lived in Paris
Julio Larraz (born 1944), painter, sculptor, political caricaturist, and cartoonist
Vicente Dopico Lerner (born 1945), painter
Manuel Castellanos López (born 1949), graphic artist
Pachy Lopez (born 1968), songwriter
Rubén Torres Llorca (born 1957), painter

M
Luis Marin (artist) (born 1948), Neo-expressionist painter 
Armando Mariño (born 1968), painter and sculptor
Juan T. Vázquez Martín (1941–2017), Cuban-born American painter, among the masters of abstract paintings in Cuba
Raul Martinez (1927–1995) painter, designer, photographer, muralist, and graphic artist
María Martínez-Cañas (born 1960), photographer
Rene Mederos (1933–1996), poster artist and graphic designer
Manuel Mendive (born 1944), painter, leading Afro-Cuban artist
Eduardo Michaelsen (1920–2010), Cuban-born painter, he died in San Francisco, California
José María Mijares (1921–2004), Cuban-born American painter, he lived in Miami, Florida
Servando Cabrera Moreno (1923–1981), painter
Enrique Caravia Montenegro (1905–1992), painter
Osvaldo Yero Montero (born 1969), sculptor, born in Camagüey

N
Adriano Nicot (born 1964), painter
Gilberto de la Nuez (1913–1993), outsider painter and woodcut maker

O
Pedro Pablo Oliva (born 1949), painter 
Pedro de Oraá (1931–2020), painter

P
Amelia Peláez (1896–1968), painter 
Gina Pellón (1926–2014), Cuban-born French painter, died Paris
Mario Perez (born 1943), painter 
Dionisio Perkins (1929–2015), Cuban-born American painter, active in Florida
Fidelio Ponce (1895–1949), painter 
René Portocarrero (1912–1995), painter
Herman Puig (1928–2021), photographer, died in Barcelona, Spain

Q
Roberto Juan Diago Querol (1920–1955), Cuban-born Spanish painter, photographer, died in Madrid 
Pablo Quert (born 1957), painter

R
Sandra Ramos (born 1969), Cuban-born American contemporary painter, printmaker, collagist, video and installation artist
Miguel Rodez (born 1956), Cuban-born American artist 
Arturo Rodríguez (born 1956), Cuban-born American painter, active in Miami 
Edel Rodriguez (born 1971), Cuban-born American illustrator, children's book author
Emilio Hector Rodriguez (born 1950), Cuban-born American abstract painter and photographer
Juan Miguel Rodríguez de la Cruz (1902–1990), ceramic artist
Gilberto Ruiz Valdez (born 1950), artist

S
José Vilalta Saavedra (1865–1912), Cuban-born Italian sculptor, who died in Rome
Baruj Salinas (born 1935), painter 
Emilio Sánchez (1921–1999), Cuban-born American painter, active in New York City
Tomás Sánchez (born 1948), painter, engraver
Edgar Soberón (born 1962), Cuban-born American painter 
Loló Soldevilla (1901–1971), painter and sculptor
Rafael Soriano (1920–2015), Cuban-born American painter, he died in Miami, Florida

T
Raúl Alfaro Torres (born 1933), painter and sculptor 
Mario Torroella (born 1935), painter
César E. Trasobares (born 1949), collage and installation artist

V
Hilda Vidal Valdés (born 1941), painter, drawer, designer, sculptor, collagist, and works in artistic tapestry, and papier mache
Víctor Manuel García Valdés (1897–1969), painter 
José Lázaro Vázquez Xene (born 1968), artist 
Luis Vega De Castro (born 1944), painter and illustrator
Fernando Velázquez Vigil (1950–2002), ceramic artist and painter
José Manuel Villa Castillo (born 1939), graphic designer, scenographic designer, interior designer, drawer, illustrator, painter, and engraver
Elio Villate (born 1957), painter
Pedro Vizcaíno (born 1966), Cuban-born American painter, drawer, performance artist, and installation artist

See also 
Cuban art
List of Cuban painters
List of Cuban women artists
List of Latin American artists
List of Cubans

External links
  Contemporary Cuban Art from The Farber Collection
  Soy Cuba Contemporary Cuban Art in UK
  Artistas Cubanos en Cuba

Cuban
Artists